Normandy High School (commonly Normandy or NHS) is a public high school in Parma, Ohio, United States, serving students in grades 8–12. The school is part of the Parma City School District, with admission based primarily on the locations of students' homes. Established in 1968, Normandy is located approximately three miles west of Interstate 77 on West Pleasant Valley Road. In the 2005-06 school year, the school had an enrollment of 1,283 students and 77.9 classroom teachers (on an FTE basis), for a student-teacher ratio of 16.5.

School information
Normandy offers a college preparatory curriculum. There are accelerated course offerings in all the academic areas. In addition to a full range of academic courses, many vocational education programs are available to students at Normandy or at Parma City School's other two high schools, Valley Forge and Parma Senior High. Twenty-one credits minimum used to be required for graduation. However, since the failure of the levy, it has been reduced to 20. More math, social studies, computer literacy and science courses are part of this requirement. The school colors are orange and white. The school is a member of the Great Lakes Conference. Normandy's corresponding middle school is Hillside, home of the Tigers whose colors are blue and white.

Notable alumni

Stephen "Suede" Baum – class of 1989, fashion designer notable for his appearance in season 5 of Project Runway
Michael Bierut – class of 1975, graphic designer
Victor Boschini – class of 1974, Chancellor of Texas Christian University
Christopher A. Boyko – class of 1972, United States District Judge
John Choma – class of 1973, former NFL player, playing in Super Bowl XVI
Mike "The Miz" Mizanin – professional wrestler and former WWE Champion

Sports
Normandy High School athletic teams competed in the Northeast Ohio Conference from its inaugural season of 2007 until its dissolution in 2015. Normandy joined the newly-formed Great Lakes Conference and began play beginning with the 2015-16 academic year.

Sports offered in the fall include dazzlers, cross country, cheerleading, American football, golf, soccer, girls' tennis and volleyball.

In the winter, sports include boys' and girls' basketball, hockey, boys' and girls' swimming and wrestling, boys' and girls' cheerleading.

Spring sports include baseball, boys' tennis, softball and track and field athletics.

Activities
Academic Challenge*
Art Club
Athletic Trainers
Audio Visual
Bowling
Cheerleaders
Choir
Computer Club
Conflict Mediators
Dazzlers
Drama
Environmental Club
French Club
GSA (Gay-Straight Alliance)
Hope Squad
Jazz Band
Junior Advisory Board*
Key Club
Marching Band
National Honor Society
Newspaper (The Vanguard)*
Office Pagers
Orchestra
Photography Club
Pop Ensemble
Polka Band
Renaissance
SADD
Senior Advisory Board
Ski/Snowboard Club
Spanish Club
Student Ambassadors
Student Government*
The Yearbook

*Currently unavailable due to budget cuts in the district.

Notes and references

External links
Normandy's High School website
Normandy's Football website
Normandy Alumni Association website

High schools in Cuyahoga County, Ohio
Parma, Ohio
Public high schools in Ohio